Cigarette Ki Tarah is a 2012 Indian Hindi-language romantic thriller film directed by Akashaditya Lama, featuring Bhoop Yaduvanshi, Prashant Narayanan, Madhurima Tuli and Sudesh Berry. The film was produced under the banner of P. Y. Films Pvt. Ltd. While the music was composed by Sudeep Banerjee, Kavita Seth, Ankur Mishra and Viraj Sawant, the lyrics have been written by Ajay Jhingran, Kaushal Kishore and Dev Shukla. Choreography in the film was handled by Vivek Yadav and Longines Fernandes.

A dispute between the director and producers over the editing of the picture led to a lawsuit in the Mumbai High Court, and eventually to what the director characterized as a "compromise" and an "edited version that did not meet my creative vision".

Plot
A guy falls in love blindly with a young beautiful girl. This blind love leads him into deep trouble, and further separates him from other people like one man versus the entire world. In these dark situations, where one surely gives up on everything, he doesn't, and thus keeps on believing and trusting on his blind love, which eventually shows him all the ways to be out from all the difficulties.

Cast

 Bhoop Yaduvanshi as Nikhil Dabur
Prashant Narayanan as Rajesh Fogat
Madhurima Tuli as Jessica
Sudesh Berry as Danny D'Gama
Ashok Banthia as Nikhil Dabur's Father
 Monika Singh as Prostitute Girl
RajKumar as Ajay Nikhil's Friend
Deepraj Rana as Corrupt Police Inspector

Soundtrack

The music is composed by Sudeep Banerjee, Kavita Seth, Ankur Mishra and Viraj Sawant whereas the lyrics of it are written down by Ajay Jhingran, Kaushal Kishore, Dev Shukla and Sudarshan Goel. The songs are sung by Tochi Raina, Nikhil D'Souza, Kavita Seth, Shweta Pandit, Suzanne D'Mello and Sudeep Banerjee.

Reception
Critic Ankur Pathak of Rediff.com panned the film, giving it no stars and calling it a "half-heartedly created music video, which tries to convince itself that it is an actual film". Shakti Shetty of Mid-Day said, "There are bad films and then there are films that shouldn't have been made in the first place. Cigarette Ki Tarah effortlessly falls into the latter category."

References

External links

 Official Theatrical Promo

2012 films
Indian romantic thriller films
2010s romantic thriller films
2010s Hindi-language films